Cileunyi-Sumedang-Dawuan Toll Road or Cisumdawu Toll Road is a toll road in West Java, Indonesia, which is currently under construction and expected to complete by 2022. The toll road will pass through Cileunyi, Tanjung Sari, Sumedang, Cimalaka, Legok, Ujung Jaya and Kertajati. This toll road will connect Padaleunyi Toll Road with Palimanan-Kanci Toll Road. The toll road will connect Bandung with Kertajati International Airport, which opened in 2018.

Construction
Due to the fact that the entire toll road is not feasible for investors, the government agreed to construct Section I and Section II. In Section II there is a  tunnel. Total cost of construction and acquisition of Cisumdawu Toll area is Rp 14 trillion. This fund is a combination of the State Budget (APBN) and loans from China. The remaining sections III to VI will be managed by Toll Road Enterprises (BUJT), namely PT Citra Marga Nusaphala Persada consortium, PT Waskita Toll Road, PT Pembangunan Perumahan, PT Brantas Abipraya, PT Jasa Sarana along .

This toll road is the first toll road in Indonesia to have a tunnel, located in section II, with a length of 472 meters and a diameter of 14 meters. The tunnel has two lanes in each directions.

The first section, connecting Cileunyi and Rancakalong for 11 kilometers, is officially open for use on 25 January 2022.

On 15 December 2022, sections II and III has been functionally opened, which connects Rancakalong-Sumedang-Cimalaka for 21 kilometers as preparations for the 2022 Christmas and 2023 New Year holidays.

As of December 2022, Section I to III is already open for public use. Meanwhile, as of November 2022, section IV is 80,85% finished, section V is 65,78% finished, and section VI is 99.18% finished

Sections
With the completion of the toll road, it is expected to shorten the travel time between Bandung and Sumedang. At the same time share the traffic load on Cadas Pangeran Road which is always crowded and will be connected to the Cikopo-Palimanan Toll Road, which is part of the Trans Java Toll Road. The toll road will consists of 6 sections, concession of Section I is held by Shanghai Construction Group, Wijaya Karya and Waskita Karya, while concessions for Section II-VI are held by Citra Marga Nursaphala Persada (IDX:CMNP):
 Section I: Cileunyi–Tanjungsari
 Section II: Tanjungsari–Sumedang
 Section III: Sumedang–Cimalaka
 Section IV: Cimalaka–Legok
 Section V: Legok–Ujungjaya
 Section VI: Ujungjaya–Dawuan

Toll gate
Note: The number on the exits is based on the distance from the western terminus of the Jakarta-Cikampek Toll Road, while the distance numbers are based on the distance from the western terminus of this toll road only

References 

Toll roads in Indonesia
Bandung
West Java